Tillandsia extensa is a species of flowering plant in the genus Tillandsia. It is endemic to Peru.

Habitat

References

extensa
Plants described in 1906
Endemic flora of Peru